Ron Henderson (born in Brisbane, Australia) is a former motorcycle speedway rider in British League and National League.

Career
Ron Henderson had two years racing in Britain, starting and finishing his career with Newcastle Diamonds, whom he helped to the National League Championship in 1976.
The Diamonds were his chief team, but he was also given rides with Hull and Swindon, as guest rider to  cover absences.
Returning to Australia, his last race was at Tivoli in Queensland in 1984, riding in four heats and winning all four.

Photo: Heat 5 Weymouth Wizards vs Newcastle Diamonds. Tom Owens leads Nigel Couzens and teammate Ron Henderson

After Speedway
Spent some time as an auto-upholsterer before a 22 year career as a Paramedic, which included being a Flight Intensive Paramedic in rescue helicopters. Forced from the career because of back problems, he retrained as a Drug and Alcohol Counsellor, completing a degree in Social Science.
Married to Sarah, with two daughters, he lives in Hobart, Tasmania.

References

External links
 https://wwosbackup.proboards.com/thread/1358
 http://www.newcastlespeedwayhistory.co.uk/ (1970s Part 2 tab)
 https://www.retro-speedway.com/backtrack-backissues-92-101 (issue 100:RON HENDERSON - exclusive interview.In a revealing new four-page interview with a key member of Newcastle's all-conquering class of '76, Ron Henderson tells KEITH McGHIE why he only sparkled briefly for Diamonds, talks about the fatal incident that led him to quit racing and the extraordinary diverse career path that followed.)

Living people
1957 births
Australian motorcycle racers
Australian speedway riders
Newcastle Diamonds riders